Jonathan Stern (born 19 May 1965) is a British sports shooter. He competed in the men's 50 metre rifle prone event at the 1996 Summer Olympics.

References

External links
 

1965 births
Living people
British male sport shooters
Olympic shooters of Great Britain
Shooters at the 1996 Summer Olympics
Sportspeople from London